The 2011 season is Daegu FC's 9th season in South Korean K-League. It will be new kit suppliers Hummel, after two seasons with Joma.

On 18 January 2011, Daegu FC announced that Park Jong-Sun had left the club by resignation, and former Samsung Lions vice-president Kim Jae-Ha was appointed as representative director.

Players

Squad

Players in / out

In

Out

Loan in

Loan out

Club

Coaching staff

Match results

K-League

League table

Results summary

Results by round

Korean FA Cup

League Cup

Squad statistics

Appearances and goals
Statistics accurate as of match played 30 October 2011

Top scorers

Top assistors

Discipline

See also
Daegu F.C.

References

External links
Daegu FC Official website  

Daegu FC
Daegu FC seasons